Hybomitra muehlfeldi   is a species of horse flies belonging to the family Tabanidae. It is a Palearctic species with a limited distribution in Europe.

References

External links
Martin C. Harvey , 2018 Key to genus Hybomitra
Images representing Hybomitra muehlfeldi

Tabanidae
Diptera of Europe
Insects described in 1880
Taxa named by Friedrich Moritz Brauer